Catorhintha is a genus of leaf-footed bugs in the family Coreidae. There are more than 30 described species in Catorhintha.

Species
These 32 species belong to the genus Catorhintha:

 Catorhintha abdita Brailovsky & Garcia, 1987
 Catorhintha apicalis (Dallas, 1852)
 Catorhintha bellatula Brailovsky & Barrera, 2010
 Catorhintha bicornigera Brailovsky & Barrera, 2010
 Catorhintha borinquensis Barber, 1923
 Catorhintha bos Blöte, 1935
 Catorhintha divergens Barber, 1926
 Catorhintha duplicata Brailovsky & Garcia, 1987
 Catorhintha elongatula Brailovsky, 1983
 Catorhintha festiva Brailovsky & Garcia, 1987
 Catorhintha flava Fracker, 1923
 Catorhintha guttula (Fabricius, 1794)
 Catorhintha kifunei Brailovsky & Garcia, 1987
 Catorhintha kormilevi Brailovsky & Garcia, 1987
 Catorhintha lucida Brailovsky & Garcia, 1987
 Catorhintha mendica Stal, 1870
 Catorhintha minor Valdés, 1911
 Catorhintha occulta Brailovsky & Garcia, 1987
 Catorhintha ocreata Brailovsky & Garcia, 1987
 Catorhintha omissa Brailovsky & Garcia, 1987
 Catorhintha pallida Mayr, 1865
 Catorhintha perfida Stål, 1860
 Catorhintha schaffneri Brailovsky & Garcia, 1987
 Catorhintha selector Stål, 1859
 Catorhintha semialba (Walker, 1872)
 Catorhintha siblica Brailovsky & Garcia, 1987
 Catorhintha sinuatipennis Berg, 1892
 Catorhintha sticta Brailovsky & Barrera, 2010
 Catorhintha tamaulipeca Brailovsky & Barrera, 2010
 Catorhintha texana Stål, 1870
 Catorhintha tumula Brailovsky & Barrera, 2010
 Catorhintha viridipes Blatchley, 1926

References

Further reading

External links

Articles created by Qbugbot
Coreini
Coreidae genera